The Q20A and Q20B (collectively referred to as Q20A/B or Q20) and Q44 bus routes constitute the Main Street Line, a public transit line in Queens, New York City, running primarily along Main Street between two major bus-subway hubs in the neighborhoods of Jamaica and Flushing. The Q20A/B terminates in College Point at the north end of Queens. The Q44 continues north into the borough of the Bronx, terminating in the West Farms neighborhood near the Bronx Zoo. The Q44 is one of two Queens bus routes to operate between the two boroughs (along with the ).

The Q44 and Q20 were originally operated by the North Shore Bus Company from the 1930s to 1947; they are now operated by MTA Regional Bus Operations under the New York City Transit brand. In June 1999, the Q44 began limited stop service in Queens, with the Q20 split into two branches to provide local service. On November 29, 2015, the Q44 was converted into a Select Bus Service (SBS) route.

Route description and service

Q44

The current Q44 route begins at the intersection of Merrick Boulevard and Archer Avenue in Downtown Jamaica, Queens (or Jamaica Center), just south of the 165th Street Bus Terminal. Traveling west along Archer Avenue, it passes the Jamaica Center station of the Archer Avenue subway and its bus terminal. At the Sutphin Boulevard subway station, which connects to the Jamaica station of the Long Island Rail Road and AirTrain JFK, the route turns north onto Sutphin Boulevard. It then turns west onto Hillside Avenue and north onto Queens Boulevard, interchanging with two stations of the IND Queens Boulevard Line.

At Main Street the Q44 turns north, running the entire distance of the street between Queens Boulevard and Northern Boulevard in Downtown Flushing (also known as Flushing Chinatown). In Downtown Flushing is the Flushing–Main Street terminal, where several bus lines, the IRT Flushing Line subway, and the LIRR Port Washington Branch interchange. The Q44 shifts onto Union Street and Parsons Boulevard to 14th Avenue in Whitestone. Throughout Queens, the Q44 provides limited-stop service, making intermittent stops primarily at major intersections and points of interest.

After entering the Bronx, the Q44 and Q50 follow the Hutchinson River Parkway service road to just south of the Bruckner Interchange, making only two stops: one at Lafayette Avenue, and another one at Brush Avenue and Bruckner Blvd, where passengers can also connect to the  bus. While the Q50 turns east to follow the Bx5, the Q44 turns west onto East 177th Street (the Cross Bronx Expressway service road), running along either direction of the road. At the Parkchester subway station, the Q44 goes around the Hugh J. Grant Circle. The Q44 continues along East 177th Street until the interchange with the Sheridan Expressway, where it turns north onto Devoe Avenue. The Q44 stops at East Tremont Avenue near the West Farms Square subway station, and terminates at East 180th Street at the southern boundary of the Bronx Zoo. Buses lay over on a bridge over the Bronx River, before reentering service on Boston Road. Although the Q44's northern terminal is signed as "Bronx Zoo" (formerly "Bronx Zoo − West Farms Square"), the zoo is not accessible from this location; the closest entrance is several blocks north at Bronx Park South and Boston Road.

Prior to 1999, the Q44 ran entirely local between Jamaica, Queens and West Farms, Bronx. It was the only bus service along Main Street in Queens. Before the implementation of Select Bus Service in November 2015, the route ran entirely local along East 177th Street. Now it employs an equivalent to limited-stop service on East 177th Street, but with no additional local route operating along the street.

Select Bus Service stops

Q20A/B
The Q20A and B services share the same routing as the Q44 between Jamaica and Whitestone, before diverging west towards their shared terminal in College Point near Flushing Bay. The Q20A branches off at 20th Avenue, running along the northern edge of the former Flushing Airport and serving a large shopping center. The Q20B turns west farther north at 14th Avenue, running through a much more residential area. Both the 20th and 14th Avenue routes were part of the original Q20, which only ran between College Point and Downtown Flushing. Both routes provide local service, but the Q20A runs at all times, while the Q20B operates only on weekdays.

History

Original route 

On February 15, 1932, North Shore Bus Company began operating a bus service to replace the Long Island Rail Road's Whitestone Branch. This service was labeled the "Q35". This service was different from the current  service between Brooklyn and Rockaway Park. It ran from the Flushing–Main Street terminal, north along Linden Street (now Linden Place) and 127th Street to 14th Avenue through Flushing and College Point. This is the routing of the current  bus in the area. The original Q35 then ran east along 14th Avenue before following the current  and  routes to Whitestone.

On May 2, 1933, North Shore Bus began a shuttle service along Main Street between Main Street/Roosevelt Avenue subway station in Flushing and Horace Harding Boulevard (now the Long Island Expressway) in Queensboro Hill. This was the predecessor to Q44 service. At the time, Main Street had yet to be extended south past Reeves Avenue (the north end of modern Queens College).

North Shore only acquired the Q25 on a temporary basis; as compensation, the city assured the company that they would get a new route between Flushing and Jamaica via Main Street. This was planned to go into service after the extension of Main Street, including a bridge over the Grand Central Parkway, was completed. In 1937, several major bus route changes occurred. Queens–Nassau Transit took over the Q25 service and combined it with their Q34 route along Linden Place and 127th Street in College Point (predecessor to the northern portion of the current Q25). The Q35 was discontinued by North Shore, and was replaced by a new Q20 service. The route of the Q20 was the same as the current route of the Q20B (via 14th Avenue), except that it continued north along 122nd Street (now College Point Boulevard) and followed the same looping route as the current Q25 (then Q34) near MacNeil Park at the north end of the borough.

Start of Q44 service 
In December 1936, North Shore applied for a franchise on route "Q-44" between Flushing and Jamaica via Main Street. On March 22, 1938, Q44 service began between Flushing–Main Street and Archer Avenue at the Jamaica Long Island Rail Road station, when Main Street was extended south to the Grand Central Parkway. The company advertised the route as the shortest "from the entire North Shore" of Queens to Jamaica, running 15 minutes between terminals. Following the opening of the Bronx–Whitestone Bridge in April 1939, North Shore began operating bus service between West Farms Square in the Bronx and the 1939 New York World's Fair in Flushing Meadows–Corona Park on July 1 of that year. On October 28, 1940, this route was combined with the Q44, running from Kew Gardens–Union Turnpike station (along the route that would become the ) through Whitestone and along East 177th Street in the Bronx to Tremont Avenue and Boston Road at West Farms Square. An alternate branch ran to Westchester Square, Bronx. By December of that year, the Q44 returned to Jamaica, running to the 165th Street Bus Terminal.

On July 1, 1939, the Q20 became interlined with the Q17, meaning that south of Flushing the bus would continue via the Q17 route to the Jamaica−165th Street terminal. The service was designated "Q17-20" or "Q20-17" and rollsigns would display Q17/20. Beginning on June 8, 1942 due to restrictions on gasoline and tire usage during World War II, the service was truncated to 14th Avenue and 122nd Street in College Point. Service north of 14th Avenue was restored on February 4, 1946. The Q20 was separated from the Q17 during off-peak "base period" hours on January 27, 1947. In March of that year, North Shore Bus would be taken over by the New York City Board of Transportation (later the New York City Transit Authority [NYCTA]), making the bus routes city operated. The joint Q17-20 service later became popular among students of St. John's University, and residents from Jamaica Estates and Flushing Heights (now Kew Gardens Hills) shopping in Downtown Flushing.

On February 3, 1957, the NYCTA separated the Q17 and Q20 services at all times, eliminated service north of 14th Avenue and 122nd Street (College Point Boulevard), and renamed the Q20 the Q44FS (Flushing Shuttle). It was one of several routes using the "Q44" designation including the Q44 itself, the Q44A (now the ), the Q44B (a shuttle to Malba, Queens which has since been discontinued), and the Q44VP (later the Q74).

During the 1964 New York World's Fair, special Q44 service was inaugurated, running to the Rodman Street entrance of Flushing Meadows Park. The routes, designated "Q44 WF" and marked "World's Fair", originated from either West Farms Square or 165th Street and made stops on the Bronx or Queens portions of the route respectively before terminating at the fair.

On July 11, 1966, the NYCTA moved the terminals of the Q13, Q14, Q16, Q28, and Q44FS from downtown Flushing to the Flushing Parking Field surrounded by 37th Avenue, Union Street, 138th Street, and 39th Avenue on a six-month pilot basis. The change, which was made at the request of multiple Queens elected officials, was intended to provide shelter for riders and reduce downtown congestion. However, due to immediate opposition from shoppers, who complained that the change forced them to walk four blocks to get from the subway to the buses, businessmen, and elected officials, on July 20, 1966, the NYCTA announced that it would undo the change on July 24. Q13, Q16, and Q28 service would go back to terminating on the north side of Roosevelt Avenue to the east of Main Street, while Q14 and Q44FS service would resume terminating on the east side of Main Street at 39th Avenue. Queens Borough President Mario Cariello had sent a letter to the NYCTA asking for the change in service to be reversed on July 18. The NYCTA had made the change in service at his request in April. Cariello noted that many of his constituents had requested the change.

In October 1969, the General Superintendent of the NYCTA recommended modifying the route of the Q44 in the Bronx to eliminate its use of streets deemed to be "inadequate for bus passage." The route would be modified to run along East Tremont Avenue between Boston Road and Bryant Avenue, Bryant Avenue between Boston Road and East Tremont Avenue, and Boston Road between Bryant Avenue and East Tremont Avenue.

Reroutes and institution of limited-stop service 
On April 15, 1990, the Q44FS was renumbered to Q20; at this time 20th Avenue service began, when the street was widened and the shopping center was constructed. In September 1995, weekend service was eliminated on the Q20, making it a weekday-only service. On January 11, 1998, the Q44 began running on Archer Avenue between Merrick Boulevard and Sutphin Boulevard in both directions to provide direct access to the Long Island Rail Road's Jamaica station and to eliminate difficult turns on congested streets. A new turnaround loop was set up using Archer Avenue, 168th Street, Jamaica Avenue, and Merrick Boulevard. Previously, southbound buses ran along Jamaica Avenue until Merrick Boulevard, and northbound buses ran along Archer Avenue and 153rd Street until they turned onto Jamaica Avenue. This change was presented to the MTA Board for approval in November 1997, and was initially going to take effect in December 1997.

On June 27, 1999, the Q44 began limited-stop service in Queens, with the Q20 split into two branches (Q20A and Q20B) to provide local service, with the Q20B providing service along the old Q20 route on 14th Street, and the Q20A providing new service along 20th Avenue. The addition of service along 20th Avenue was done at the request of owners of commercial developments on the avenue, such as BJ's and Target. Weekend service was also restored on the Q20A. Since the Q44 became limited, the Q20 was extended south along Main Street to make local stops. Prior to the change, Q20 service had run during weekdays only from 5 a.m. to 11 p.m. at frequencies of 15 to 30 minutes. At this time, the Q44 was shifted from its historical route in the neighborhood of Briarwood between Union Turnpike and Hillside Avenue. It had previously turned east onto the Grand Central Parkway service road and then turned south onto 150th Street towards Jamaica, the same route employed since 1938 when Main Street dead-ended at the Grand Central service road. It was rerouted to continue south via Main Street, and then via Queens Boulevard to Hillside Avenue. Initially, Q44 buses made limited stops from 6 a.m. to 10 p.m. on weekdays, from 7 a.m. to 10 p.m. on Saturdays, and from 8 a.m. to 10 p.m. on Sundays. The changes in service on the Q44 and Q20 were made to increase ridership growth and to serve new markets. On July 29, 1999, a meeting was held at Borough Hall, with officials of the MTA in attendance, to discuss the changes. Many riders spoke against the changes, noting that the change made it harder for senior citizens and people with disabilities who had used the stops along 150th Street, and that the change added an additional transfer to complete their trips, requiring an additional fare. A spokesperson for the MTA said that it had no plans to revert the change in service, and noted that the areas on Queens Boulevard and Main Street that the Q44 was rerouted to had increased in density. Briarwood residents had organized and circulated a petition in opposition to the loss of bus service on 150th Street soon after the changes took effect. This change was announced to elected officials in late March 1999, and was approved by the MTA Board on April 15, 1999.

On April 1, 2005, Q44 limited-stop service at Main Street and Sanford Avenue was discontinued, with service continuing to be provided by the Q20A and Q20B.

Select Bus Service and service expansion

In 2004 and 2006, the Main Street corridor was identified as a potential route for Flushing-Jamaica bus rapid transit (BRT) service, as part of the first phase of the MTA and DOT's Select Bus Service (SBS) plan. The corridor was ultimately not included in the first phase of SBS routes. In February 2008, the MTA proposed an additional limited-stop service on the northern portion of the corridor between Flushing and Fordham Plaza, provisionally named the Q94.

Though the Q94 was never implemented, the Q44 route was included in the SBS Phase II study in 2009. By 2013, the Q44 was the first route in Queens to have a full fleet of articulated buses; the same buses (the Nova Bus LFS model) used on SBS service. In 2014, the 164th Street corridor and the Parsons/Kissena corridor ( and ) joined the Main Street corridor as potential SBS routes between Flushing and Jamaica. The Q25 Limited and Q44 Limited were selected for further studies, with the Q44 prioritized due to its high ridership, interborough connection between Queens and the Bronx, and the width of Main Street to facilitate bus lanes. As part of the conversion, eight stops in the Bronx were eliminated; those retained constituted 85% of passenger usage in the borough. Several limited stops in the Jamaica business district were also eliminated. In addition, Q44 Limited stops at Guy R Brewer Boulevard/165th Street and Archer Avenue, Main Street and Northern Boulevard, Parsons Boulevard and 17th Avenue, Parsons Boulevard and 21st Avenue, and the southbound only stop at Whitestone Expressway and Center Drive were eliminated.

On November 29, 2015, the Q44 SBS began service, operating 24 hours a day. The Q20A became a full-time route to replace the discontinued late-night-only Q44 local route.

Bus redesign
In December 2019, the MTA released a draft redesign of the Queens bus network. As part of the redesign, the Q44 would have become a "high-density" route called the QT44 and would be extended in the Bronx to Fordham Plaza Bus Terminal. The Q20 would have been replaced by a "neighborhood" route, the QT86, which would run from Linden Place in College Point to Cooper Avenue in Glendale, leaving the Main Street corridor at Vleigh Place. The 20th and 14th Avenue corridors would have been served by the QT64 and QT84, respectively.

The redesign was delayed due to the COVID-19 pandemic in New York City in 2020, and the original draft plan was dropped due to negative feedback. A revised plan was released in March 2022. Under the new plan, the Q44 would still be extended to Fordham Plaza. The Q20 would still run on Main Street but would no longer have branches; the 20th and 14th Avenue corridors would be taken over by the Q76 and Q31, respectively. The northern part of the Q20 would take over the Q15's routing in Beechhurst, while its southern terminus would be cut back to the Briarwood station.

Incidents 

On September 18, 2017, during the morning rush hour, a private tour bus moving at a high speed collided with the back of a New Flyer Xcelsior XD40 Q20A bus turning from Main Street onto Northern Boulevard in Flushing. The bus then plowed into a Kennedy Fried Chicken restaurant at the corner of the intersection. The accident killed 3 people including the tour bus driver, and injured at least 17. The private charter bus company had been repeatedly cited for reckless driving. The charter driver was a former MTA bus driver, until he was fired in April 2015 after a crash in his personal automobile in which he pleaded guilty to driving under the influence and leaving the scene of the crash.

See also
Q17 (New York City bus), another New York City bus route connecting Flushing to Jamaica
Q25 and Q34 buses, another New York City bus corridor connecting Flushing to Jamaica
Q65 (New York City bus), another New York City bus route connecting Flushing to Jamaica
Q74 (New York City bus), a former New York City bus route that ran on Main Street

References

External links

 Q44 Select Bus Service − mta.info
 The Bronx-Flushing-Jamaica Select Bus Service − NYCDOT

Q020
020
Transportation in the Bronx
Q44